Jevpur is a village located near the Ganga (Ganges) River in Uttar Pradesh, India. It comes under the Ghazipur (Loksabha) Parliamentary Constituency and the Zamania Legislative Assembly. It is about  distance from the town of Zamania, about  approx distance from Ghazipur, and  distant from Lucknow. The Ganga is on the village's western side and on its eastern side is a shrine to Shiva, locally called Maheshwar Nath Baba.

In Jevpur there is Shivaji Sporting Play ground beside the main road that is used for playing tournaments of district level and local games. janta Inter College just beside the play ground is there. This village is not so populated but castes live separately that is called "Toli". Mainly this village has many caste like Rajput Families, Yadavs, Harizans, Prajapati, Brahmans, etc. Newly built hanuman mandir on the bank of river ganga is the main attraction of tradition for the village people. Mainly people of village love to spend their time there in the evening. The temple was made by the efforts of 7 villages near and around Jevpur Like Mahewa, Tazpur, Deoria, Zamania, Khiddirpur, Mathare, Harpur.

Villages in Ghazipur district